Verica Nedeljković (born 16 September 1929), née Jovanović, is a Serbian and Yugoslav chess player who holds the title of Woman Grandmaster (WGM, 1978). She is a six-time winner of the Yugoslav Women's Chess Championship (1950, 1951, 1952, 1953, 1958, 1965).

Biography
From the mid-1950s to the late 1960s, she was one of the leading Yugoslav women's chess players. Verica Nedeljković won the Yugoslav Women's Chess Championships six times: 1950, 1951, 1952, 1953, 1958 and 1965. The winner of many international chess women's tournaments, including twice in a row in Belgrade (1961, 1962).

Verica Nedeljković four times participated in the Women's World Chess Championship Candidates Tournaments:
 In 1955, at Candidates Tournament in Moscow has taken 6th place;
 In 1959, at Candidates Tournament in Plovdiv has taken 2nd place;
 In 1961, at Candidates Tournament in Vrnjačka Banja shared 4th-6th place;
 In 1964, at Candidates Tournament in Sukhumi has taken 9th place;
 In 1967, at Candidates Tournament in Subotica has taken 6th place.

Verica Nedeljković played for Yugoslavia in the Women's Chess Olympiads:
 In 1963, at second board in the 2nd Chess Olympiad (women) in Split (+12, =0, -0) and won the team silver medal and the gold individual medal,
 In 1966, at second board in the 3rd Chess Olympiad (women) in Oberhausen (+4, =4, -2).

In 1954, Verica Nedeljković was awarded the FIDE Woman International Master (WIM) title, but in 1978 she received the honorary title of FIDE Woman Grandmaster (WGM).

After graduation, she was a ship engineer and a candidate for technical sciences. Worked as a lecturer at the University of Belgrade. Been married to a chess player, a chess trainer and a medical doctor by profession - Srećko Nedeljković (1923—2011).

References

External links
 
 
 
 
 

1929 births
Living people
Serbian female chess players
Yugoslav female chess players
Chess woman grandmasters
Chess Olympiad competitors
Sportspeople from Čačak